.nl is the Internet country code top-level domain (ccTLD) for the Netherlands. It is one of the most popular ccTLDs with over six million registered .nl domains .

When cwi.nl was registered by Centrum Wiskunde & Informatica on 1986-05-01, .nl became the first active ccTLD outside the United States.

Registry
Most registrars are ISPs, IT service bureaus and media service bureaus, but several large enterprises with many brand names have also become a registrar, or participant as SIDN calls them, which is a quite uncommon phenomenon in the domain name industry. Registrars have to pay SIDN a fee for each domain since 1 April 1996, until then registration was free. SIDN does not deal directly with registrants.

Second-level domains
Official second-level domains do not exist. A number of companies have taken the opportunity to register domains like co.nl and com.nl, using them to sell third-level domains. These are not affiliated with SIDN.

Individuals were allowed to register a second-level .nl domain since 2003. As a forerunner, individuals were allowed to register a third-level domain since 2000. They never became popular, and registration has been suspended since 2006. Because there were only around 500 of such domains registered, in contrast to about 5 million second-level domains, SIDN announced the discontinuance of personal domains as of 2008 on 4 July 2007.

Other country-code TLDs under the Kingdom of Netherlands
 .an – ccTLD for the former multi-nation Netherlands Antilles federation
 .aw – ccTLD for Aruba
 .bq – ccTLD for the Caribbean Netherlands (Bonaire, Sint Eustatius, and Saba)
 .cw – ccTLD for Curaçao
 .sx – ccTLD for Sint Maarten

See also

 Internet in the Netherlands
 .amsterdam - TLD for Amsterdam
 .eu – ccTLD for the European Union
 .frl - TLD for the province of Friesland

References

External links
 .nl Domain Delegation Data
 .nl Registry website
 List of .nl registrars

1986 establishments in the Netherlands
Internet properties established in 1986
Country code top-level domains
Internet in the Netherlands
Mass media in the Netherlands
Council of European National Top Level Domain Registries members

sv:Toppdomän#N